Jaan Tomp (10 September 1894 in Tuhalaane Parish (now Mulgi Parish), Kreis Fellin – 14 November 1924 in Tallinn) was an Estonian communist, politician, and member of Parliament. The chairman of the Central Council of the Workers' Unions of Estonia, he was sentenced to death at the Trial of the 149.

References

1894 births
1924 deaths
People from Mulgi Parish
People from Kreis Fellin
Central Committee of Tallinn Trade Unions politicians
Workers' United Front politicians
Communist Party of Estonia politicians
Members of the Riigikogu, 1920–1923
Members of the Riigikogu, 1923–1926
russian military personnel of World War I
Estonian military personnel of the Estonian War of Independence
Executed Estonian people
Deaths by firearm in Estonia
People executed for treason against Estonia